Hamer Hall may refer to:

Australia 
Hamer Hall, Melbourne, concert hall within Melbourne's Arts Centre

United States 
Hamer Hall (Hamer, South Carolina), listed on the National Register of Historic Places (NRHP)
Hamer Hall (California University of Pennsylvania), an athletic facility and competition venue at California University of Pennsylvania

See also
Hamer House (disambiguation)

Architectural disambiguation pages